"Cherry" (parsed as CHE.R.RY) is the eighth single of singer/songwriter Yui released March 7, 2007. It broke her personal record for highest first week sales, exceeding the 75,390 copies sold during the first week of sales for Rolling Star.

This song also overtook Hikaru Utada's Flavor of Life for number one on Chaku-Uta downloads, but Flavor of Life beat it to number one the next day. Its PV has peaked at number two for downloads.

The lead A-side, Cherry, was used as a song for the KDDI au Listen Mobile Service CM.

The music video was directed by Takahiro Miki.

The song was used as ending theme for the 15th episode of the anime ReLIFE, as well as its appearance in the 2021 Netflix film Ride or Die.

Track listing

Charts

Oricon sales chart (Japan)

Certifications

References

External links
Cherry lyrics
Official Yui website

2007 singles
Yui (singer) songs
Songs written by Yui (singer)
2007 songs